The Far Eastern Branch of the Russian Academy of Sciences (Russian:Дальневосточное отделение Российской академии наук)( abbr. FEB RAS) is a regional branch of the Russian Academy of Sciences, which is a developed geographically distributed system of complex research centers, institutes, stations, and research stations, reserves, covering almost the entire territory of the Far Eastern Federal District. The research centers of the FEB RAS are located in Vladivostok, Khabarovsk, Petropavlovsk-Kamchatsky, Magadan, Blagoveshchensk, Yuzhno-Sakhalinsk. Separate institutes operate in Birobidzhan, Anadyr.

At the beginning of 2017, about 7,500 people worked in the Far Eastern Branch, among them 2,500 researchers, including 23 academicians and 141 corresponding members of the Russian Academy of Sciences, at the beginning of 2005 more than 300 doctors and 1150 candidates of sciences.

References

Russian Academy of Sciences